Paul Lowes (born 8 June 1966) is a New Zealand cricketer. He played in eight first-class matches for Central Districts in 1990/91.

See also
 List of Central Districts representative cricketers

References

External links
 

1966 births
Living people
New Zealand cricketers
Central Districts cricketers
Cricketers from Hastings, New Zealand